Normanna Reef is a reef lying near the center of the south entrance to the sound in the Melchior Islands, Palmer Archipelago. The name appears on a chart based upon a 1927 survey by DI personnel, but this may reflect an earlier naming by whalers. The name presumably derives from the Normanna Whaling Co. of Sandefjord, Norway, or one of its ships that worked in this area.

References

External links

Reefs of Graham Land
Landforms of the Palmer Archipelago